Jhargram Raj was a  zamindari (feudatory kingdom) which occupied a  position in Bengal region (present-day West Bengal, India) of British India. The zamindari came into being during the later part of the 16th century when Man Singh of Amer was the Dewan/Subahdar of Bengal (1594–1606). Their territory was centered around present-day  Jhargram district. Jhargram was never an independent territory since the chiefs of the family held it basically as the zamindars of the British Raj in India after Lord Cornwallis's Permanent Settlement of 1793. Although its owners were both rich and powerful, with the chiefs of the family holding the title of Raja, the Jhargram estate was not defined as a Princely State with freedom to decide its future course of action at the time of Indian independence in 1947. Later, the Vice-Roy of India agreed to recognize Jhargram as "Princely State" after the Second World War, but the proposal taken back as the British had decided to give independence to India.

Cooch Behar was the only princely state in Bengal and Tripura. There were several princely states in neighboring Orissa, especially Mayurbhanj that had a presence in Kolkata.

History

Jhargram Raj was founded around 1592 AD by Sarveshwar Singh who along with his elder brother were Generals under Man Singh of Amer and came to conquer Bengal when Emperor Akbar granted Subehdari of Bengal, Bihar, and Orissa to Raja Man Singh. He defeated and vanquished the local Mal tribal kings who were ruling the region known as Junglekhand, even today in order to commemorate this victory, every year an idol of Mal Raja is made and slain on Vijayadashami day. As a reward, Raja Man Singh, granted mansabdari of the entire region of Junglekhand to his victorious generals Sarveshwar Singh and his elder brother, under suzerainty and subordination as a tributary vassal state to the Mughal Emperor Akbar. He named his capital Jhargram which means a village surrounded by deep forests, hence the rulers of Jhargram assumed the title “Malla Deb”.

The first fortress was supposed to have existed in Old Jhargram, but the ruins of the fortress are said to have gone underground due to some unknown reasons. He took the title of Raja and named the state capital Jhargram, which means a forest village which is surrounded by walls and canals.  It was known as Ugal in the local language. Even today, the day after Durga Ashtami, the four corners (Ugals) are worshiped for the protection of the erstwhile kingdom. The man who was the hero or bull within the surrounded wall and canal were called Ugal Sanda. As such, the full name of the Raja of the State was known as Raja Sarveshwar Malla Ugal Sanda Deb, and the title has been continued up to Raja Narasingha Malla Ugal Sanda Deb.

During the Maratha invasion of Bengal between 1741–51,the king of Jhargram Raja Man Govind Malla Dev joined his armed forces with the Raja of Bishnupur and the Nawab of Bengal to fight a war against them, and they were victorious. Jhargram remained an independent kingdom until 1767, when The East India Company, led by Robert Clive, came from Midnapore, via Radhanagar to capture the Jhargram fort. The then king of Jhargram Raja Vikramjit Malla Ugal Sanda Deb took part in the Chuar Rebellion to protect his independent status and revolted against the British, but he ultimately surrendered. The kingdom was then recognized as a Zamindari estate under the law of primogeniture, and the ruler was given the title of Raja. Jhargram fell twice into the Court of Wards, after the death of Raja Raghunath Malla Ugal Sanda Deb and Raja Chandi Charan Malla Ugal Sanda Deb, respectively; but was later released when the Raja Narasingha Malla Deb attained majority. In this connection, it may be mentioned that in 1944–45, the then Vice-Roy of India agreed to recognize Jhargram as a feudatory state; but at that time, the whole of India was going through turmoil and was moving towards independence. The Cabinet mission came to negotiate with Congress, the Muslim League, and other parties. The proposal for the feudatory status of Jhargram Raj has put aside then.

Rajas of Jhargram Raj

Raja Sarveshwar Malla Ugal Sanda Deb, 1st Raja of Jhargram, founder of Royal family of Jhargram. He fortified the new capital with a canal-ed fort known as “Ugal” in local language, and respectfully the title of “Ugal Sanda” (Lord of the Fort) became part of the name and style of the rulers of Jhargram; married and had issue.

Administration

The royal family were Zamindars of Jhargram under the British government rule, they were politically powerful and financially wealthy. The Zamindar was conferred with the title of Raja and was appointed to the Legislative Council of Bengal. The Zamindari ruled their dominions and estates from Jhargram Palace in present-day West Bengal, they had 8 sardars under the system and one Sub Zamindar of Beliaberah.

The period 1922–1950 was considered as the golden era for Jhargram Raj, with Rai Bahadur Debendra Mohan Bhattacharya as the Dewan, Jhargram developed into a township, and many educational institutions were established. The Jhargram Kumud Kumari Institution was founded in 1924. In 1925, an annual sports fund was created to encourage athletic activities and to construct a football stadium and the Jhargram Club. Raja Bahadur established Jhargram Agricultural College, which was later renamed Jhargram Raj College, as well as Vidyasagar Polytechnic for industrial training. He provided funds to set up Sri Ramkrishna Saradapeeth Girls High School and Bharat Sevashram Sangha. In 1931, he commissioned a new palace on 23 acres of land; it is a prominent example of Indo-Saracenic architecture. During World War II, he constructed Dudhkundi Airfield for the United States Air Force and provided the Allied forces with elephants, vehicles, and other help.

With the consent of the governor of Bengal, a hospital for lower-class residents of Jhargram Raj was established in the name of the 15th king Raja Chandi Charan Malla Deb. Later, similar hospitals were established in every tehsil to serve nearby villages. The raja donated land to the Roman Catholic Church of India and to the Muslim community to build Nurrani Jama Masjid, a mosque, in Jhargram. In 1947, more land was acquired, and the Rani Binode Manjuri Government Girls' School—now one of the premier schools in West Bengal—was built. In Midnapore, Raja Bahadur founded the Tuberculosis Chest Clinic and the Homeopathic College, and gave donations for the construction of the Vidyasagar Memorial and the purchase of books for a library. He also bore all of the expenses to build the Midnapore Club and Jhargram Stadium. (It was renamed Aurobinda Stadium after his death.) Between 1928 and 1950, the estate contributed hundreds of thousands of rupees to welfare causes. In 1947,  10,000 bighas of land to poor farmers, making Raja Narasingha the single largest land donor in West Bengal. His beneficiaries ranged from the Kolkata Bangiya Sahitya Parishad to New Delhi Kali Bari.

Legacy of the Raj family

The last and the 16th king Raja Narasingha Malla Deb reigned from 1916 until his royal powers were abolished by an amendment to the Constitution of India in 1954. After losing his royal title, he served for two terms as a member of the Legislative Council of Bengal. He also served in the Lok Sabha, the lower house of the Indian Parliament.

The royal family was known for working to rehabilitate refugees after the partition of India. After India gained its independence, they owned a business in Kolkata and large real estate properties in Kolkata, Midnapore, and Digha. Narsingha's son Yuvraj Birendra Bijoy got involved in politics and was a two-time member of the Legislative Assembly of West Bengal from Jhargram's Vidhan Sabha constituency, representing the Indian National Congress. His son Shivendra Bijoy Malla Deb—Narasingha Malla Deb's grandson—is a social worker and politician associated with the All India Trinamool Congress, and the chairman of the municipality of Jhargram. They currently reside in Jhargram Palace and have converted about 15 rooms on the ground floor  into a Heritage Hotel run by them.

See also
 Political integration of India

Further study
 The Indian princes and their states Author Barbara Ramusack

References

Bengali zamindars
Zamindari estates
Quasi-princely estates of India
1710 establishments in Asia
1950 disestablishments in India